The Campanha Ocidental micro-region (Microrregião de Campanha Ocidental, meaning the western fields in Portuguese) is a microregion in the western part of the state of Rio Grande do Sul, Brazil.  The area is 31,125.429 km² making it the largest micro-region in the state nearly covering one-tenth of the entire state, much of the central and eastern portions remain underpopulated.

Municipalities 
The microregion consists of the following municipalities:
 Alegrete
 Barra do Quaraí
 Garruchos
 Itaqui
 Maçambara
 Manoel Viana
 Quaraí
 São Borja
 São Francisco de Assis
 Uruguaiana

References

Microregions of Rio Grande do Sul